John Savile, 3rd Earl of Mexborough (3 July 1783 – 25 December 1860), styled Viscount Pollington until 1830, was a British peer and Tory politician.

Origins
He was the son of John Savile, 2nd Earl of Mexborough by his wife Elizabeth Stephenson, a daughter of Henry Stephenson.

Political career
At the 1807 general election, Mexborough was returned as a Member of Parliament (MP) for Pontefract, having unsuccessfully contested the seat in 1806. He was defeated at the 1812 general election, but won the seat back at by-election in December 1812, and held it until he stood down at the 1826 election. He was re-elected in 1831, but did not stand again at the 1832 general election.

He succeeded his father in the earldom in 1830. However, as this was an Irish peerage it did not entitle him to a seat in the House of Lords.

Marriage and children

In 1807 he married Lady Anne Yorke (d.1870), a daughter of Philip Yorke, 3rd Earl of Hardwicke by his wife Elizabeth Lindsay, a daughter of James Lindsay, 5th Earl of Balcarres. By Lady Anne Yorke he had issue including:
John Savile, 4th Earl of Mexborough, eldest son and heir.

Death
He died in December 1860, aged 87, and was succeeded in the earldom by his eldest son, John Savile, 4th Earl of Mexborough.

References

External links 
 

1783 births
1860 deaths
Tory MPs (pre-1834)
Members of the Parliament of the United Kingdom for English constituencies
UK MPs 1807–1812
UK MPs 1812–1818
UK MPs 1818–1820
UK MPs 1820–1826
UK MPs 1830–1831
UK MPs 1831–1832
UK MPs who inherited peerages
Savile, John, 03 Earl of Mexborough
Earls of Mexborough